This page is an overview of Hong Kong at the UCI Track Cycling World Championships.

2015 

Hong Kong competed at the 2015 UCI Track Cycling World Championships in Saint-Quentin-en-Yvelines at the Vélodrome de Saint-Quentin-en-Yvelines from 18–22 February 2015. A team of 11 cyclists (6 women, 5 men) was announced to represent the country in the event.

Results

Men

Sources

Women

Sources

== 

Hong Kong competed at the 2016 UCI Track Cycling World Championships at the Lee Valley VeloPark in London, United Kingdom from 2–4 March 2016. A team of 7 cyclists (4 women, 3 men) was announced to represent the country in the event.

Results

Men

Sources

Women

Sources

References

Nations at the UCI Track Cycling World Championships
Hong Kong at cycling events